Judith Helen Vigna (born 1936 ) was a British-American writer who became known in the late 1990s and early 2000s because of her children's books that covered controversial topics such as drug addiction, alcoholism, homosexuality, racism, death of beloved ones, monoparental families, depression, among others. The only information known about her is from the biographies at the end of her books.

Biography 

Judith Vigna was born in 1936, in England, and studied art both in London and in New York.  
In 1987 she received the Jane Addams Children's Book Award for her book Nobody Wants a Nuclear War.

Bibliography

She published books mainly in 1980s and 1990s

 I live with Daddy
 Daddy's new baby
 Mommy and me by ourselves again
 Anyhow, I'm glad I tried
 Everyone goes as a pumpkin
 When Eric's mom fought cancer
 Couldn't we have a turtle instead?
 Boot weather
Black Like Kyra, White Like Me
 She's not my real mother
 Saying goodbye to Daddy
 Gregory's stitches
 Zio Pasquale's Zoo
 Grandma without me
 My Big Sister Takes Drugs
 Uncle Alfredo's zoo
 The hiding house
 I Wish Daddy Didn't Drink So Much
 The little boy who loved dirt and almost became a Superslob
 Nobody Wants a Nuclear War
 My Two Uncles (1995)

References

1936 births
American women children's writers 
American children's writers
Year of death missing